

Top Division

Group A

Head coach:  Willie Desjardins

Head coach:  Štefan Mikeš

Head coach:  Dean Blais

Head coach:  Andrejs Maticins

Head coach:  Jakob Kölliker

Group B

Head coach:  Pär Mårts

Head coach:  Vladimir Plyushchev

Head coach:  Jaromir Sindel

Head coach:  Hannu Jortikka

Head coach:  Dieter Werfring

NHL prospects by team
There were 84 NHL-drafted prospects playing in the tournament, out of 219 total players. This is an increase of 14.5% over the previous edition of this tournament which had 72. The Latvian and Austrian teams did not have any NHL prospects on their rosters. There were also several eligible for the 2010 draft.

References
http://www.iihf.com/channels0910/wm20/statistics.html

See also
 2010 World Junior Ice Hockey Championships
 2010 World Junior Ice Hockey Championships – Division I
 2010 World Junior Ice Hockey Championships – Division II
 2010 World Junior Ice Hockey Championships – Division III

Rosters
World Junior Ice Hockey Championships rosters